China Post, legally the China Post Group Corporation, is the state-owned enterprise operating the official postal service of China, which provides the service in mainland China, excluding its special administrative regions, Hong Kong and Macau, which have their own postal service independent of the mainland's. The Corporation officially shares its office with the sub-ministry-level government agency State Post Bureau which regulates the national postal industry theoretically including the corporation.

History 

The Customs Post Office of the Qing dynasty was established in 1878 by Robert Hart at the suggestion of the foreign powers, with branch offices in five major trading cities. On 20 March 1896, the Customs Post Office became the Great Qing Post, which in 1911 became independent of the customs service. The Great Qing Post became the Chunghwa Post in 1912. Chunghwa postal service had signed a contract with the China Airways Federal group in 1929 to transport airmail on the Shanghai-Hankou, Nanjing-Beijing, and Hankou-Guangzhou routes. Chunghwa Post had functioned as the main postal service provider of Mainland China until 1949.

The current postal service of People's Republic of China was established in 1949. It replaced the Chunghwa Post in mainland China in 1949, as well as in the Universal Postal Union in 1972. It was formerly administered by the Ministry of Posts and Telecommunications. China Post is directly supervised by the State Post Bureau which has overall responsibility for regulating postal service in China. The State Post Bureau is an agency reporting to the Ministry of Information Industry of the People's Republic of China.

Organizational structure 

After the separation from the State Post Bureau and several re-organization, China Post is currently organized along the following structure.
 General Office
 Department of Strategic Planning (Legal Affairs)
 Department of Market
 Department of Financial Service
 Postal Savings Bank of China
 China Post Life Insurance
 China Post Securities
 China Post Capital Management
 Department of Finance
 Department of Human Resources
 Department of Planning and Construction
 Department of Procurement Management
 Department of Audit
 Department of Party Building Work
 Office of Inspection
 China Post Trade Union
 Unit of Parcel, Express and Logistics Business (China Postal Express and Logistice Co., Ltd.)
 China National Philatelic Corporation
 China Post Culture and History Center (China National Post and Postage Stamp Museum)
 China Post News Press
 Postage Stamp Printing Bureau (Beijing Stamp Factory)
 Shijiazhuang Posts and Telecommunications Technical College (China Post Training Center & Party School)
 China Post Group IT (Beijing) Co., Ltd.
 China Post E-commerce Co.
 China Post Advertising Co., Ltd.
 Other province-level, prefecture-level and county-level branches

China Post Service
International services for China Post include Small Parcel, Large Package and EMS. The Small parcel and large package of China Post can be tracked if registered. According to transportation methods, it can be divided into three categories: Air Parcel, Surface Air Lift (SAL) Parcel, and Surface Parcel. China Post air mail/parcel is the most popular because it is cheap and convenient. EMS is faster than China Post Mail but more expensive.

China post does currently not offer shipping by boat to the United States from Mainland China. This policy went into effect November 2021.

Operations 

 Postal offices and branches: 373,600 (2019）
 Mail processing centers: 236
 First and second class truck route: 6.3 million kilometers （2014）
 Transportation vehicles: 86,000 （2014）
 Aircraft: 33（2020）
 Railway carriages: 174（2014）
 Letter sorting machines: 155
 Automatic parcel sorting machines: 209
 Computerized postal offices: 20,000

See also 
 State Post Bureau
 Hongkong Post
 CTT (Macau)
 Chunghwa Post
 Chinese postal romanization
 China Postal Savings Bank
 China Postal Airlines

References

External links 

 China Post 
 China Post 
 China Post international parcel tracking 
 China Postal Express & Logistics Company 
 PRC State Post Bureau, China Post  
 Message from the Director General 
 Provide Feedback to the Secretary Director Ma Junshang 
 Imperial China postal history

 
Postal organizations
Postal system of China
Government-owned companies of China
Companies based in Beijing
Transport companies established in 1997
Chinese brands